PGE Skra Bełchatów 2012–2013 season is the 2012/2013 volleyball season for Polish professional volleyball club PGE Skra Bełchatów. The club won bronze medal of FIVB Volleyball Club World Championship, was 5th team of PlusLiga, lost in quarterfinals of Polish Cup and lost in playoff 12 of CEV Champions League.

The club competed in:
 Polish Championship
 Polish Cup
 CEV Champions League
FIVB Club World Championship
ENEA Polish SuperCup

Team roster

Squad changes for the 2012–2013 season

In:

Out:

Most Valuable Players

General classification

References

PGE Skra Bełchatów seasons